Calonotos rectifascia is a moth of the subfamily Arctiinae. It was described by George Talbot in 1932. It is found in Colombia.

References

Arctiinae
Moths described in 1932